The Campaign for Tobacco-Free Kids is an American non-profit membership organization that advocates in favor of reducing tobacco consumption. It has been called "a leading anti-tobacco organization" by the New York Times.

History
It was established in September 1995, with Bill Novelli as its first president. Novelli resigned from the organization in 1999 to work at the AARP. On January 1, 2000, Novelli was replaced by Matthew Myers, who has been the organization's president ever since. Organizations that helped to found the Campaign for Tobacco-Free Kids included the Robert Wood Johnson Foundation, the American Cancer Society, and the American Heart Association, among others.

References

External links

Organizations established in 1995
1995 establishments in Washington, D.C.
Non-profit organizations based in Washington, D.C.
Tobacco control
Public health organizations